George Hopkins (born 1858) was an American baseball pitcher and second baseman in the pre-Negro leagues. He played many seasons for the Chicago Unions, and for Iowa's Algona Brownies and Minnesota's Minneapolis Keystones.

Hopkins played with many popular players of the day, including Dangerfield Talbert, Henry W. Moore, Chappie Johnson, Albert Toney, and Harry Hyde.

References

External links

Chicago Unions players
Leland Giants players
Algona Brownies players
Minneapolis Keystones players
Page Fence Giants players
1858 births
Year of death missing